Aepeomys is a small genus of rodents in the family Cricetidae. The species in this genus are found in Ecuador (A. lugens) and Venezuela (both species).

It contains the following two species:
 Olive montane mouse (Aepeomys lugens)
 Reig's montane mouse (Aepeomys reigi)

References

 
Rodent genera
Taxonomy articles created by Polbot